The American Aerolights Double Eagle is a two-seat ultralight aircraft that can also be configured for single pilot operation.

Development
The Double Eagle is a modification to the Eagle ultralight designed by Larry Newman in 1980. The aircraft features a stall-resistant canard design with a two axis control system. The entire aircraft could be folded into an 11 ft by 9 inch package for car transport.

Operational history
The Monterey Park, California Police Department was the first police department to fly an ultralight aircraft for patrols, using the Double Eagle in 1982. The program lasted six months and was shelved after seven engine failures in flight. An example of the aircraft resides in the Smithsonian Air and Space Museum at the Steven F. Udvar-Hazy Center, and at one time also in the EAA AirVenture Museum in Oshkosh, Wisconsin.

Specifications (variant specified)

See also

References

1980s United States ultralight aircraft
American Aerolights aircraft
Canard aircraft
Single-engined pusher aircraft
Aircraft first flown in 1982